Kasımpaşa Spor Kulübü. (Kasımpaşa Sports Club), commercially registered as Kasımpaşa Sportif Faaliyetleri A.Ş., colloquially known Kasımpaşa, is a Turkish professional football club located in the Beyoğlu district of Istanbul.

The club plays their home games in the Recep Tayyip Erdoğan Stadium in Kasımpaşa, a neighbourhood of the district of Beyoğlu. As of 2021–22 season, Kasımpaşa is one of six Süper Lig clubs representing Istanbul, along with Fenerbahçe, Galatasaray, Beşiktaş, Fatih Karagümrük S.K. and İstanbul Başakşehir. In November 2021, the club officially celebrated its centenary of existence.

History
The club was found as "Kasımpaşa Gençik Kulubü" in 1921, following the merger of two local clubs, namely "Altuntuğ" and "Kasımpaşa Terbiye-i Bedeniye Kulübü". They played their first competitive match in 1923-1924 season. The club played in the Istanbul First League between 1939–1945 and 1946–1959. The club was promoted to the Türkiye Ligi in 1959 and remained there for 5 seasons, where their best finish was 5th in 1961–62 season.

After 43 years, on 30 May 2007, the team was promoted to the Süper Lig for the second time in their history. In a dramatic match against Altay, Kasımpaşa came from behind twice to force a penalty shootout, which they won 4–3. They competed in the Süper Lig in the 2007–08 season, but were relegated back to the TFF First League.

Kasımpaşa was promoted to Süper Lig for the third time in the club's history on 17 May 2009, beating Karşıyaka 2–1 after extra time in Ankara. The team remained in the top tier of Turkish football and managed to finish in top ten in the 2009–10 season, during which they beat Fenerbahçe away from home 3–1 and Beşiktaş away in the Turkish Cup by the same score. They also beat Trabzonspor at home in the league by the same 3–1 scoreline.

By the beginning of the 2010–11 season, Kasımpaşa lost some of their important players due to the decisions of coach Yılmaz Vural just before the season started. After the squad weakened, the team went on a run of poor results and were relegated at the end of the season. In the 2011–12 season, the team made a rapid return to Süper Lig after play-off matches that were played in Ankara. They first beat Konyaspor 2–0 away and 4–0 at home. Then they played the final against Adanaspor and beat them 3–2 after a dramatic match on 27 May 2012. This was their 3rd consecutive victory in play-off finals since 2007. Thus, they represented their neighbourhood in Süper Lig in the 2012–13 season. Despite challenging for a UEFA Europa League spot throughout the season, rising as a dark horse in the league, a series of dismal performances in the final few matches saw Kasımpaşa finishing sixth in the table, five points away from Bursaspor on fourth, the final Europa League qualification spot.

Since 2013, Kasımpaşa have lured well-known players such as Ryan Babel from Ajax and striker Eren Derdiyok from the Bundesliga and have continued to invest and strengthen their squad.

Grounds

Recep Tayyip Erdoğan Stadium

Named after President Recep Tayyip Erdoğan, the stadium is also known as Kasımpaşa Stadium. It has a seating capacity of about 14,000.

Kasımpaşa Kemerburgaz Tesisleri

The club also makes use of the facilities of the Kasımpaşa Sports Club in Kemerburgaz.

Achievements

Honours
2. Lig
Winners (1): 2005–06
3. Lig
Winners (3): 1988–89, 1996–97, 2004–05

League affiliation
 Süper Lig: 1959–64, 2007–08, 2009–11, 2012–
 TFF First League 1964–68, 1989–92, 1997–2000, 2006–07, 2008–09, 2011–12
 TFF Second League: 1968–79, 1984–89, 1992–97, 2000–01, 2005–06
 TFF Third League: 2001–05
 Amateur Level: 1979–1984

Kit manufacturers and shirt sponsors

Players

Current squad

Out on loan

Club officials

Board members

Technical staff

Presidential history

See also
List of Turkish Sports Clubs by Foundation Dates

References
Notes

Citations

External links
Official website
Kasımpaşa on TFF.org

 
Association football clubs established in 1921
1921 establishments in the Ottoman Empire
Football clubs in Turkey
Süper Lig clubs
Sports teams in Istanbul